The following is a list of Sport Club do Recife managers.

 Ricardo Diéz (1941)
 Cilinho (1973–74)
 Ênio Andrade (1978)
 Barbatana (1981)
 Givanildo Oliveira (1983–84)
 Mário Juliato (1984)
 Carlos Alberto Silva (1985–86)
 Ênio Andrade (1986)
 Jair Picerni (1987)
 Émerson Leão (1987–88)
 Antônio Lopes (1988)
 Givanildo Oliveira (1991–92)
 Gílson Nunes (1993)
 Givanildo Oliveira (1994–95)
 Hélio dos Anjos (1996–97)
 Mauro Fernandes (1998)
 Ricardo Gomes (Jan 1, 1999 – June 30, 1999)
 Júlio César Leal (Feb 1, 1999 – June 30, 1999)
 Émerson Leão (2000)
 Jair Pereira (2001)
 Hélio dos Anjos (2003–04)
 Heriberto da Cunha (June 23, 2004 – Feb 1, 2005)
 Adilson Batista (Feb 5, 2005 – April 4, 2005)
 Edinho (July 25, 2005 – Aug 21, 2005)
 Dorival Júnior (Nov 7, 2005 – Sept 4, 2006)
 Givanildo Oliveira (Aug 1, 2006 – Dec 6, 2006)
 Alexandre Gallo (Dec 7, 2006 – April 24, 2007)
 Giba (May 3, 2007 – June 11, 2007)
 Edson Leivinha (interim) (June 15, 2007 – June 18, 2007)
 Geninho (June 19, 2007 – Dec 31, 2007)
 Nelsinho Baptista (Dec 10, 2007 – May 28, 2009)
 Émerson Leão (June 4, 2009 – July 27, 2009)
 Péricles Chamusca (July 31, 2009 – Nov 7, 2009)
 Givanildo Oliveira (Nov 10, 2009 – May 26, 2010)
 Toninho Cerezo (May 27, 2010 – Aug 9, 2010)
 Geninho (Aug 10, 2010 – Feb 6, 2011)
 Hélio dos Anjos (Feb 8, 2011 – June 20, 2011)
 Paulo César Gusmão (Aug 18, 2011 – Oct 30, 2011)
 Mazola Júnior (Oct 29, 2011 – May 13, 2012)
 Vágner Mancini (May 16, 2012 – Aug 12, 2012)
 Waldemar Lemos (Aug 17, 2012 – Oct 6, 2012)
 Sérgio Guedes (Oct 7, 2012 – Dec 4, 2012)
 Vadão (Dec 22, 2012 – March 7, 2013)
 Sérgio Guedes (March 2013 – May 13)
 Marcelo Martelotte (May 24, 2013 – Sept 7, 2013)
 Neco (Sept 2013)
 Geninho (Sept 13, 2013 – Jan 30, 2014)
 Eduardo Baptista (Feb 14, 2014 – Sept 17, 2015)
 Paulo Roberto Falcão (Sept 20, 2015–July 2016)
 Oswaldo de Oliveira (2016)
 Daniel Paulista (2016–2017)
 Ney Franco (2017)
 Daniel Paulista (interim) (2017)
 Vanderlei Luxemburgo (2017–)

References 

Sport
Managers